Objat is a railway station in Objat, Nouvelle-Aquitaine, France. The station is located on the Nexon - Brive railway line. The station is served by TER (local) services operated by SNCF.

After a landslide in 2018 disrupted the rails just to the North of Objat, the section between Objat and Saint-Yrieix is travelled by a rail replacement bus service.

Train service
The following services currently call at Objat:
local service (TER Nouvelle-Aquitaine) Limoges - Saint-Yrieix - Brive-la-Gaillarde

References

Railway stations in Corrèze